Valeryia Bohdan (born 12 June 2000) is a Belarusian footballer who plays as a midfielder for FC Minsk and the Belarus women's national team.

References

2000 births
Living people
Belarusian women's footballers
Women's association football midfielders
Belarus women's international footballers